Haldenstein Castle is a castle in the former municipality of Haldenstein (now part of Chur) of the Canton of Graubünden in Switzerland.  It is a Swiss heritage site of national significance.

See also
 List of castles in Switzerland

References

Chur
Cultural property of national significance in Graubünden
Castles in Graubünden